Kherreh Siah (also Romanized as Kherreh Sīāh, Kharreh Seyāh, and Kharreh Sīāh) is a village in Zagheh Rural District, Zagheh District, Khorramabad County, Lorestan Province, Iran. At the 2006 census, its population was 94, in 22 families.

References 

Towns and villages in Khorramabad County